The AAC World Heavyweight Championship was a professional wrestling world heavyweight championship owned and promoted by the Atlantic Athletic Commission in Boston. The title was created in 1957 when Edouard Carpentier defeated the NWA World Heavyweight Champion Lou Thesz when Thesz could not continue due to a back injury. As it was a professional wrestling championship, the AAC World Heavyweight Championship was not won not by actual competition, but by a scripted ending to a match.

Title history

Footnotes

References

World heavyweight wrestling championships